Stefan Olsson defeated Gustavo Fernández in the final, 7−5, 3−6, 7−5 to win the wheelchair gentlemen's singles tennis title at the 2017 Wimbledon Championships.

Gordon Reid was the defending champion, but was defeated in the quarterfinals by Olsson.

Seeds

 Gordon Reid (quarterfinals)
 Gustavo Fernández (final)

Draw

Finals

References
WC Men's Singles

Men's Wheelchair Singles
Wimbledon Championship by year – Wheelchair men's singles